Simon Daniels (born June 24, 1964) is a Brazilian musician, best known as the lead singer and rhythm guitarist for American glam metal band Autograph. Daniels replaced original lead singer Steve Plunkett after he quit in 2013.

Biography 
Simon moved from Brazil to Los Angeles in 1985 and shortly after formed the band Agent X, with guitarist Billy D'Vette (Pair-A-Dice), they recorded "Rock n Roll Angels" with Kim Fowley (Kiss & Runaways). He then merged with former Rough Cutt members Amir Derakh, Matt Thorr and Dave Alford and started Jailhouse.  In the mid-'90s, Simon formed a band called Flood that signed to Interscope Records, produced by Bob Marlette and Terry Date. In 2013, the band Jailhouse did a reunion show on the Monsters of Rock Cruise and later that year he was asked to join Autograph because Steve Plunkett was not being interested in doing the reunion tour.

Discography

with Agent X 
 Rock n Roll Angels (1987)

with Jailhouse 
 Alive in a Mad World (1989)
 Jailhouse (1998)

with Flood 
 Flood (1997)

with Autograph 
 Louder (2016)
 Get Off Your Ass (2017)

References 

Living people
1964 births